Acacia retinervis is a tree or shrub belonging to the genus Acacia and the subgenus Juliflorae endemic to northern western Australia.

Description
It has fissured brown to grey-brown bark with resinous, scurfy, rusty-brown new shoots that occasionally have a dense covering of silver hairs with glabrous to sparsely haired, terete, light brown to reddish coloured branchlets. Like many species of Acacia it has phyllodes rather than true leaves. It blooms from April to September producing yellow flowers.

Taxonomy
The species was first formally described bu the botanist George Bentham in 1842 as part of William Jackson Hookers work Notes on Mimoseae, with a synopsis of species as published in the London Journal of Botany. It was reclassified as Racosperma retinerve by Leslie Pedley in 2003 then transferred back to genus Acacia in 2006.

Distribution
It is native to a large area in the Kimberley region of Western Australia where it grows among sandstone or laterite. It is situated on the mainland extending from the coast south to the Mitchell Plateau and the catchment area of the Prince Regent River where it is usually found among outcrops of sandstone rock.

See also
List of Acacia species

References

retinervis
Acacias of Western Australia
Plants described in 1842
Taxa named by George Bentham